Arabana or Arabuna  is an Australian Aboriginal language of the Pama–Nyungan family, spoken by the Wongkanguru and Arabana people.

The language is in steep decline, with an estimated 250 speakers according to 2004 NILS, to just 21 speakers found in the 2006 census.

Geographic distribution 
Arabana is spoken at Neales River on the west side of Lake Eyre west to the Stuart Range; Macumba Creek south to Coward Springs; at Oodnadatta, Lora Creek, Lake Cadibarrawirracanna, and The Peake. Their boundary with the Kokatha People to their west is marked by the margin of the scarp of the western tableland near Coober Pedy.

Dialects

Arabana has three dialects: Piltapalta, which Hercus refers to as "Arabana Proper", Wangkakupa, and Midhaliri. Wangganguru was also considered a dialect.

Phonology
Most of the nasals and laterals are allophonically prestopped.

Arabana has three phonemic vowel sounds, /i a u/ as is typical in other Australian languages.

Bibliography 
 Hercus, Luise. 1994. A grammar of the Arabana-Wangkangurru language Lake Eyre Basin, South Australia: Pacific Linguistics C128. Canberra: Pacific Linguistics.

References

External links 
 Arabana Aboriginal Corporation, representing traditional owners of Arabana country
 Bibliographies of published, rare or special materials on Arabana language and people, at the Australian Institute of Aboriginal and Torres Strait Islander Studies

Karnic languages
Critically endangered languages
Endangered indigenous Australian languages in South Australia